Li Yunting (born 2 April 1989) is a Chinese former footballer.

References

1989 births
Living people
Chinese footballers
Chinese expatriate footballers
Association football midfielders
Singapore Premier League players
Chinese expatriate sportspeople in Singapore
Expatriate footballers in Singapore